Ibdaa Cultural Center is a grassroots community-based project in the West Bank's Palestinian Dheisheh refugee camp. The name, "Ibdaa" (ابداع), is translated from Arabic as "creation" or "creative ability". Ibdaa Cultural Center was established in 1994 and since then has served more than 1,200 children and youth annually and provides employment and income for more than 70 families in the refugee camp. The Center's goal is empowering the camp's children, youth and women and educating the international community about Palestinian refugees.

Documentary film
A thirty-minute documentary released in 2002 and entitled "The Children of Ibdaa: To Create Something Out of Nothing" focuses on the Ibdaa Cultural Center's children's dance troupe. A tour followed the documentary's release.

References

External links

Palestinian charities
Organizations established in 1994
1994 establishments in the Palestinian territories